"Cheatin' Songs" is a song recorded by American country music band Midland. It is the second single from their second studio album Let It Roll. The band wrote the song with Josh Osborne and Shane McAnally.

Content
Mark Wystrach, Jess Carson, and Cameron Duddy wrote the song with Shane McAnally and Josh Osborne. The song is about a man who wonders if his partner is cheating on him.

Music video
The music video was filmed during a live performance from the Palomino, a small club in North Hollywood, directed by Collin Duddy. The group is seen performing the song.

Charts

Weekly charts

Year-end charts

References

2020 singles
2020 songs
Midland (band) songs
Songs written by Jess Carson
Songs written by Cameron Duddy
Songs written by Shane McAnally
Songs written by Josh Osborne
Songs written by Mark Wystrach
Song recordings produced by Dann Huff
Song recordings produced by Shane McAnally
Big Machine Records singles